Yugo & Lala 3 is a 2016 Chinese animated fantasy adventure film directed by Wang Yunfei. The third film in the Yugo & Lala film series, it was preceded by 2014's Yugo & Lala 2. It was released in China by July 29, 2016.

Plot

Cast
Liu Xiaoyu 
Meng Quanlin
Lu Kui
Baomu Zhongyang
Guo Zhengjian
Bai Xuecen
Liu Qianhan
Wang Linxi
Zhang Yutong
Deng Weifeng
Feng Sheng
Yang Tianxiang
Su Shangqing
Chen Liyang
Guo Haoran
Chen Meijun
Xie Yaxin
Han Xiao

Reception
The film has grossed  at the Chinese box office.

References

Chinese animated films
2016 animated films
2016 films
Chinese animated fantasy films
Animated adventure films
2010s fantasy adventure films
Chinese fantasy adventure films
Chinese sequel films